Grace Kirby is an English film and television actress. She played Female Cenobite in Clive Barker's directorial debut Hellraiser (1987).

Filmography
Hellraiser (1987) – Female Cenobite
Heavenly Pursuits (1986) – French Teacher

Television
Screen Two (1990) – Widow (episode: The Man from the Pru)
The Houseman's Tale (1987) – Redhead (episode: Episode #1.1)

Personal life
As of 2006, Kirby was a drama teacher in Cumbria (UK). She is also Clive Barker's cousin.

References

External links 
 

Year of birth missing (living people)
English film actresses
English people of Irish descent
Drama teachers
English television actresses
Living people